Carolina Stramare (born 27 January 1999, in Genoa) is a beauty pageant titleholder of the Miss Italia 2019. She won the crown on 6 September 2019 and dedicated the victory to her mother.

References

1999 births
People from Genoa
Living people
Italian beauty pageant winners